The Brown-Bryson Farm, in Greene County, Georgia near Siloam, Georgia, dates from c.1870. It was listed on the National Register of Historic Places in 1999.

The main house is a one-and-one-half-story Gothic Revival-style cottage with
a center-passage plan and a rear kitchen ell.

Outbuildings may date from c.1870 when the original main house, which burned in 1873 or 1874, was built.

References

Farms in Georgia (U.S. state)
National Register of Historic Places in Greene County, Georgia
Gothic Revival architecture in Georgia (U.S. state)
Houses completed in 1870